Ivan Pavlovich Levenets (born 22 February 1980) is a Russian former professional footballer who played as a goalkeeper for Lokomotiv Moscow in the Russian Premier League. His previous clubs include FC Amkar Perm, FC Spartak Anapa, Chernomorets Novorossiysk, FC Anapa, Zhemchuzhina Sochi.

Career statistics

References

1980 births
Living people
People from Anapa
Russian footballers
FC Lokomotiv Moscow players
Russian Premier League players
Association football goalkeepers
FC Amkar Perm players
FC Chernomorets Novorossiysk players
FC Zhemchuzhina Sochi players
FC Spartak-UGP Anapa players
Sportspeople from Krasnodar Krai